Cwmffrwd is a village in Carmarthenshire, Wales, located around two miles (3.2 km) south of Carmarthen.

Cwmffrwd is mainly a 20th-century settlement dominating the small river Nant Cwmffrwd, with some 19th-century elements. Its main access road, Heol Nantyglasdwr, connects the village to the A484 and leads directly into the main residential street, Maesglasnant.

The stone bridge over the river Nant Pibwr north of Cwmffrwd, at the old highway leading to Carmarthen, may have been built on remains of Roman foundations.

Landmarks
St. Anne's is a small church north-east of the village.

Transport
Buses stop in both directions on the A484.

References

Villages in Carmarthenshire